Untamed Frontier is a 1952 American Western film directed by Hugo Fregonese and starring Joseph Cotten, Shelley Winters and Scott Brady. The film, featuring the working title of The Untamed featured the feature film debuts of Suzan Ball and Fess Parker.

Plot
To the irritation of the US Government, the Denbow family freeze out homesteaders by denying access across their land, using the government land for grazing their cattle herds.

Meanwhile,  to evade a murder charge, Glenn Denbow marries the only witness, Jane, who's conveniently in love with him, but favors the settlers. When Glenn goes back to his blackmailing old flame Lottie, a warm regard develops between Jane and cousin Kirk Denbow. Things come to a head when an impending range war coincides with a rustling foray.

Cast
 Joseph Cotten as Kirk Denbow
 Shelley Winters as Jane Stevens
 Scott Brady as Glenn Denbow
 Suzan Ball as Lottie
 Minor Watson as Matt Denbow
 Katherine Emery as Camilla Denbow
 José Torvay as Bandera (as Jose Torvay)
 Douglas Spencer as Clayton Vance
 John Alexander as Max Wickersham
 Lee Van Cleef as Dave Chittun
 Richard Garland as Charlie Fentress
 Robert Anderson as Ezra McCloud
 Fess Parker as Clem McCloud
 Ray Bennett as Sheriff Brogan
 David Janssen as Lottie's Dance Partner
 Lalo Ríos  as Pepe (uncredited)

References

External links

1952 films
1952 Western (genre) films
Universal Pictures films
Films set in Texas
Films scored by Hans J. Salter
American Western (genre) films
Films directed by Hugo Fregonese
1950s English-language films
1950s American films